Havid Landi Dak is a town and union council of Bannu District in Khyber Pakhtunkhwa province of Pakistan.

References

Union councils of Bannu District
Populated places in Bannu District